The Constitution of the Autonomous Administration of North and East Syria, officially titled Charter of the Social Contract, is the provisional constitution of the self-proclaimed autonomous region known as the Autonomous Administration of North and East Syria. It was adopted on 29 January 2014, when the Democratic Union Party (PYD), the political wing of the People's Protection Units (YPG) and the largest party in the autonomous region, declared the three regions it controlled autonomous from the Syrian government. Article 12 states the autonomous region remains an "integral part of Syria", anticipating a future federalization of Syria.

The constitution has gained much international attention and is most noted for its explicit affirmation of minority rights, gender equality, and a form of direct democracy known as 'democratic confederalism'.

On 27–28 June 2016, the executive committee to organize a constitution for the region, to replace the 2014 constitution, presented its draft.

Background 

When the Syrian Civil War broke out in 2011, the Syrian Kurdish parties avoided taking sides. When Syrian government forces retreated in mid-2012 to fight the mostly Arab rebels elsewhere, Kurdish groups gradually took control. On 12 July 2012, the two main political alliances in the autonomous region, the Movement for a Democratic Society (including Democratic Union Party (PYD)) and the Kurdish National Council (KNC) formed Kurdish Supreme Committee (KSC) as the overarching governing body of all three self-proclaimed cantons of Afrin, Kobane and Jazira. The PYD and its armed wing People's Protection Units (YPG) soon became the dominant force. Soon PYD and other allied parties in Movement for a Democratic Society declared a unilateral interim government in November 2013 and also a committee was appointed to write a transitional constitution. Nevertheless in January 2014 it agreed to form a coalition government with the KNC, but this agreement didn't last long.

Contents

Preamble 
Text of the preamble:
We, the people of the Democratic Autonomous Regions of Afrin, Jazira and Kobani, a confederation of Kurds, Arabs, Syriacs, Arameans, Turkmen, Armenians and Chechens, freely and solemnly declare and establish this Charter.

In pursuit of freedom, justice, dignity and democracy and led by principles of equality and environmental sustainability, the Charter proclaims a new social contract, based upon mutual and peaceful coexistence and understanding between all strands of society. It protects fundamental human rights and liberties and reaffirms the peoples’ right to self-determination.

Under the Charter, we, the people of the Autonomous Regions, unite in the spirit of reconciliation, pluralism and democratic participation so that all may express themselves freely in public life. In building a society free from authoritarianism, militarism, centralism and the intervention of religious authority in public affairs, the Charter recognizes Syria’s territorial integrity and aspires to maintain domestic and international peace.

In establishing this Charter, we declare a political system and civil administration founded upon a social contract that reconciles the rich mosaic of Syria through a transitional phase from dictatorship, civil war and destruction, to a new democratic society where civic life and social justice are preserved.

General Rules
(Articles 81–96)
The section "IX General Rules" lists general rules including criteria for constitutional amendment and martial law.
Article 95 lists the bodies of the executive council:

See also 
 Constitution of Syria

External links

An English translation of the Social Contract of the autonomous region

References 

Rojava
Politics of the Autonomous Administration of North and East Syria